West Montagu is a rural locality in the local government area (LGA) of Circular Head in the North-west and west LGA region of Tasmania. The 2016 census recorded a population of 45 for the state suburb of West Montagu.

History 
West Montagu was gazetted as a locality in 1973.

Geography
The waters of Robbins Passage, an inlet of Bass Strait, form the northern boundary, and the Montagu River forms the eastern.

Road infrastructure 
Route C215 (Montagu Road) runs through from east to west.

References

Towns in Tasmania
Localities of Circular Head Council